The 2010–11 season was the 111th season in Società Sportiva Lazio's history and their 23rd consecutive season in the top-flight of Italian football.

Season review

Pre-season
Part of the pre-season was dominated by speculation surrounding Aleksandar Kolarov's possible transfer. In late July, Manchester City managed to procure the left back. A couple of days, later Lazio presented Javier Garrido, surplus to requirements in Manchester City, as his replacement.

Lazio was also able to land Brazilian international Hernanes from São Paulo. The highly rated player signed a five-year deal with the club for an undisclosed fee thought to be in the region of £8.2 million. He was given shirt number 8, previously worn by Karel Poborský and Bernardo Corradi, among others.

Players

Squad information

Competitions

Serie A

League table

Results summary

Results by round

Matches

Statistics

Appearances and goals

|}

References

S.S. Lazio seasons
Lazio